Rough-and-tumble play, also called play fighting, is a form of play where participants compete with one another attempting to obtain certain advantages (such as biting or pushing the opponent onto the ground), but play in this way without the severity of genuine fighting (which rough-and-tumble play resembles). Rough-and-tumble play is one of the most common forms of play in both humans and non-human animals.

It has been pointed out that despite its apparent aggressiveness, rough-and-tumble play is helpful for encouraging cooperative behavior and cultivation of social skills. For rough-and-tumble play to remain "play" (instead of spiraling into a real fight), there has to be cooperation (e.g., with participants agreeing to not actually exert forces in pretend punches). Sometimes, one participant may push or hit harder than expected, and then the other participants will have to decide whether it was an unintended mistake or a malicious transgression. Thus, rough-and-tumble play involves considerable social reasoning and judgment.

References

External links 
Rough and Tumble Play. Scholarpedia.

Play (activity)
Aggression
Ethology
Learning
Childhood
Mock combat
Fight play